The 1932–33 Ottawa Senators season was the team's 15th season in the NHL and 47th season of play overall.  After a one-year hiatus, as the Senators had suspended operations for the 1931–32 NHL season, the team rejoined the NHL, and announced former Senators star player Cy Denneny as head coach of the club.

Regular season
Players on loan to other clubs were returned to the Senators, including Syd Howe and captain Frank Finnigan. Former Boston Bruins star player Cooney Weiland joined the team and led the Senators in goals (16) and points (27), while Howe would chip in with 12 goals and 24 points. Rookie right-wing Gus Forslund played the season for the Senators, becoming the first Swedish-born player in the NHL. The Senators blueline was led by Allan Shields, who led all defensemen with 11 points, while leading the team and being among the NHL leaders in penalty minutes at 119.

In goal, Alec Connell would start the season for the Senators, however, he would miss some games due to injury, and would eventually lose his starters job to Bill Beveridge, who emerged as the teams number 1 goaltender. Beveridge would lead the team with 7 victories, while Connell would post a team best 2.56 GAA.

The Senators would start off the season with a respectable 7–7–3 record through their first 17 games, however, they would slump to a 4–20–7 record the rest of the way, and owner Frank Ahearn had Denneny fine some players who displayed indifferent hockey. The Sens would finish in last place in the NHL for the second straight time.

Final standings

Record vs. opponents

Schedule and results

Player statistics

Regular season
Scoring

Goaltending

Transactions
The Senators were involved in the following transactions during the 1932–33 season.

Trades

Free agents signed

See also
 1932–33 NHL season

References,Playoffs

 
SHRP Sports
The Internet Hockey Database

They didn't qualify for the playoffs

Ottawa Senators (original) seasons
Ottawa
Ottawa